The Copper Creek Guard Station was built by the Civilian Conservation Corps in 1935. It is located in a very remote area, near Black Canyon City, Arizona, United States. It was listed on the National Register of Historic Places in 1993 for its architecture. It was designed by the USDA Forest Service in Bungalow/Craftsman style. It served historically as a camp and as a government office.

In the 1920s and 1930s, Forest Service employees often traveled many miles from local ranger stations to forest work sites. Since the forest road networks were not well developed, getting to a job site meant a long trek, carrying all the equipment needed to perform the field work. This made it impractical for employees to make daily round trips. To facilitate work at remote sites, the Forest Service built guard stations at strategic locations throughout the forest to house fire patrols and project crews.

After World War II, the Forest Service greatly expanded its road network, allowing employees to get to most National Forest areas within a few hours. As a result, guard stations lost their utility. The Forest Service found new uses for some stations, but most were demolished or abandoned.

In the 1990s, historic preservation groups, with the support of Forest Service employees, began pressing National Forest managers to preserve the remaining structures. To finance the preservation effort, the Forest Service started renting its guard stations to the public. It later began renting out many unused fire lookout towers as well.

Its Bungalow style was of the architecture adopted most widely by the USFS architects of the region.

References

Government buildings completed in 1935
Buildings and structures in Yavapai County, Arizona
Civilian Conservation Corps in Arizona
Park buildings and structures on the National Register of Historic Places in Arizona
United States Forest Service architecture
1935 establishments in Arizona
National Register of Historic Places in Yavapai County, Arizona